The 1955–56 Cypriot Second Division was the third season of the Cypriot second-level football league. Aris Limassol won their 2nd title.

Format
Eight teams participated in the 1955–56 Cypriot Second Division. The league was split into two geographical groups, depending from which Districts of Cyprus each participated team came from. All teams of each group played against each other twice, once at their home and once away. The team with the most points at the end of the season were crowned group champions. The winners of each group played against each other in the final phase of the competition and the winner were the champions of the Second Division. The champion was promoted to the 1956–57 Cypriot First Division. 

Teams received two points for a win, one point for a draw and zero points for a loss.

Changes from previous season
Teams promoted to 1955–56 Cypriot First Division
 Nea Salamis Famagusta

Teams relegated from 1954–55 Cypriot First Division
 Aris Limassol

New members of CFA
 Apollon Limassol

Members that withdrew from CFA
 Gençlik Gücü 
 Gençler Birliği 
 Mağusa Türk Gücü
 Doğan Türk Birliği

Stadiums and locations

Nicosia-Larnaca-Keryneia Group
League standings

Results

Limassol-Paphos Group
League standings

Results

Champions Playoffs 
Aris Limassol 3 – 0 Orfeas Nicosia (GSO Stadium, June 3, 1956)
Orfeas Nicosia 2 – 1 Aris Limassol (GSP Stadium (1902), June 10, 1956)

Aris Limassol were the champions of the Second Division and they were promoted to the 1956–57 Cypriot First Division.

See also
 Cypriot Second Division
 1955–56 Cypriot First Division
 1955–56 Cypriot Cup

Sources 

Cypriot Second Division seasons
Cyprus
1955–56 in Cypriot football